Galbitalea is a genus of bacteria from the family of Microbacteriaceae which has been isolated from the sap of the tree Acer mono in Korea.

References

Microbacteriaceae
Bacteria described in 2014
Monotypic bacteria genera